The Big Don't Argue is the third studio album released by Australian rock band Weddings Parties Anything. The album was produced by Jim Dickinson, who had worked with Big Star and the Rolling Stones."A Tale they won't Believe" relates to a tale from Australia’s colonial past, a macabre account of escaped convicts making their way across Tasmania, resorting to cannibalism to survive the long trek in the bush. It was based on a passage in Robert Hughes’ The Fatal Shore.

Track listing 
All songs written by Mick Thomas, except where noted
 "Streets of Forbes" (Traditional)
 "The Ballad of Peggy and Col" (Mark Wallace, Mick Thomas)
 "Knockbacks in Halifax"
 "Never Again (Albion Tuesday Night)" (Traditional, Mick Thomas)
 "A Tale They Won't Believe"
 "House of Ghosts" [mistakenly omitted from track listing]
 "Hug My Back"
 "The Wind and the Rain"
 "Darlin' Please"
 "Ticket in Tatts"
 "Rossarden"
 "Mañana, Mañana"

Personnel

Weddings Party Anything 
 Richard Burgman - guitar, vocals
 Pete Lawler - bass guitar, vocals
 Marcus Schintler - drums, vocals
 Mick Thomas - guitar, vocals
 Mark Wallace - piano accordion, vocals

Additional musicians 
 Hiram Green - pump organ, tack piano
 Peter Hyrka - fiddle
 Mojo Nixon - vocals
 Skid Roper - whistle (Human)

References 

1989 albums
ARIA Award-winning albums
Weddings Parties Anything albums